The second season of ABC Family drama television series Switched at Birth was commissioned on August 17, 2012.  It premiered on January 7, 2013, in the United States and consisted of 21 episodes. The season is produced by ABC Family, Pirates' Cove Entertainment and Suzy B Productions, with Paul Stupin, Becky Hartman Edwards, John Ziffren, and series creator Lizzy Weiss serving as executive producers.

The one-hour scripted drama revolves around two teenagers who discover they were switched at birth and grew up in very different environments.  While balancing school, jobs, and their unconventional family, the girls, along with their friends and family, experience deaf culture, relationships, classism, racism, audism, and other social issues.

The ninth episode of the season, entitled "Uprising", made television history by becoming the first episode of a national mainstream television series to be told almost entirely in American Sign Language.

Cast

Main
 Sean Berdy as Emmett Bledsoe
 Lucas Grabeel as Toby Kennish
 Katie Leclerc as Daphne Paloma Vasquez
 Vanessa Marano as Bay Madeleine Kennish
 Constance Marie as Regina Vasquez
 Gilles Marini as Angelo Sorrento
 D. W. Moffett as John Kennish
 Lea Thompson as Kathryn Kennish

Recurring

 Ryan Lane as Travis Barnes
 Cassi Thomson as Nikki Papagus
 Marlee Matlin as Melody Bledsoe
 Blair Redford as Tyler "Ty" Mendoza
 Stephanie Nogueras as Natalie Pierce
 Matt Kane as Jace
 Max Lloyd-Jones as Noah
 Matthew Risch as Chip Coto
 Ivonne Coll as Adrianna Vasquez
 Daniel Durant as Matthew
 B.K. Cannon as Mary Beth Tucker
 Annie Ilonzeh as Lana
 Morgan Krantz as Mac
 Brandon J. Sornberger as Mark
 Kari Coleman as Whitney
 Todd Williams as Zane
 Robert Curtis Brown as Ivan Ronan
 Brian Gutierrez as Cody
 Danielle Rayne as Patricia Sawyer
 Jerry Ferris as Coach Lubin
 Anthony Natale as Cameron Bledsoe
 Joey Lauren Adams as Jennice Papagus
 Laura Spencer as Parker Robinsan
 Carlease Burke as Ms. Rose
 Maiara Walsh as Simone Sinclair
 Justin Bruening as Jeff Reycraft
 Allison Scagliotti as Aida Adams
 Stephen Lunsford as Teo Hanahan
 Zoey Deutch as Elisa Sawyer
 Charlene Amoia as Diana Coto
 William Lucking as Bill Kennish
 Kim Rhodes as Tria
 Meeghan Holaway as Amanda Burke
 Karla Gutierrez as Amy
 Suanne Spoke as Karen Barnes
 Cass Kroener as Jane
 Larry Sullivan as Leo
 Laura Brown as Debbie

Episodes

Production
"Uprising", the season's ninth episode, was the first episode of a national mainstream scripted television series to be told almost entirely in American Sign Language (ASL), with open captions for hearing viewers. Series creator Lizzy Weiss described the innovative concept, stating:

Reception

U.S. ratings

References

2013 American television seasons
Switched at Birth (TV series)